Karthikappalli is a small village in Kozhikode district in the state of Kerala, India.

Economy
There is a strong agrarian sector, and the crops are mainly coconuts and arecanuts. Paddy cultivation has a major setback now, as is the case with most of Kerala, with paddy fields being claimed for houses and for more profitable crops. Migration to the Middle East (Gulf) and to the major cities in India is prevalent.

Transportation
Karthikappalli village connects to other parts of India through Vatakara city on the west and Kuttiady town on the east.  National highway No.66 passes through Vatakara and the northern stretch connects to Mangalore, Goa and Mumbai.  The southern stretch connects to Cochin and Trivandrum.  The eastern Highway  going through Kuttiady connects to Mananthavady, Mysore and Bangalore. The nearest airports are at Kannur and Kozhikode.  The nearest railway station is at Vatakara.

Temples/Masjids 
Karthikappalli Sri Durga Devi temple is the main temple.

Elengoli Juma Masjid and Kombukulam Juma masjid are the main mosques in Karthikappalli.

Educational institutions
There are three primary and one upper primary schools in Karthikappalli, including KARTHIKAPPALLI L P SCHOOL'Karthikappalli No.1 UP school, Karthikappalli North LP School(Vaprath School),and Karthikappalli North Mopla LP School. But for higher education, students have to go to Villyappalli, Purameri or Orkkatteri (neighbouring villages).
MES Public school also situated in Karthikappalli.

There are two Madrasas offering religious education to Muslim students - Elengoli Noorul Islam Madrasa and Kombukulam Madrasa

References

Villages in Kozhikode district
Vatakara area